Louis-Frédéric Nussbaum, also known as Louis Frédéric or Louis-Frédéric (1923–1996), was a French scholar, art historian, writer and editor. He was a specialist in the cultures of Asia, especially India and Japan.

Early life
Louis-Frédéric was born in Paris in 1923.  He studied at the Sorbonne and the École Pratique des Hautes Études.

Career
Louis-Frédéric wrote many books on India, Japan and Southeast Asia.  He was the editor of the 10-volume Encyclopaedia of Asian Civilizations which was published in eight editions in English between 1977 and 1987. Louis-Frédéric's Japan Encyclopedia is published by the Harvard University Press; and it has six editions in English and French between 1996 and 2005.

Selected works
Dans les pas du Bouddha, introduction de Jean Filliozat, professeur au Collège de France, Edition Hachette, Paris, 1957, 128p.
L'Inde jour et nuit, Edition Julliard, Paris, 1957.
La Danse sacrée de l'Inde, Éditions Arts et Métiers Graphiques, Paris, 1957, 136 p., rééd. 2010, 144 p.
L'Inde, temples et sculptures, Éditions Arts et Métiers Graphiques, introduction de Jean Naudou, Paris, 1959, 470 p. traduction Thames and Hudson, Londres; Abrams, New York; Kohlhammer Verlag, Stuttgart.
Yoga-asanas, Éditions J. Olivien, Paris, 1957, réédition 1959,1961.Dieux et brâhmanes, Edition Livre de Paris, Paris, 1961.Le Règne des idoles, Edition Hachette, Paris, 1961. traduction Codex, Buenos Aires.Tout autour de toi, Prix Lica 1962, Edition Emile Paul, Paris, 1960.L'Inde au fil des jours, collection Connaissance de l'Asie, Société continentale d'éditions modernes illustrées, Paris, 1963, 337 p. réédition 1970.Sud-Est asiatique, temples et sculptures, Éditions Arts et Métiers Graphiques, Paris, 1964, 434 p. traduction Abrams, New York; Burkhardt, Essen.Trésors de l'art des Indes, Edition Marabout, Verviers, 1965.Manuel pratique d'archéologie, Éditions Robert Laffont, Paris, 1967,432 p., réédition 1978 et 1983, traduction Marabout, Bruxelles; Ugo Mursia, Milan; Almedina, Coimbra.La Vie quotidienne au Japon à l'époque des samouraï (1185-1603), Éditions Hachette, 1968, 258 p. traduction Famot, Genève; Allen & Unwin, Londres; Praeger, New York; Tuttle, Tôkyô; Gondolat, Budapest; Panstwovy, Varsovie; Rizzoli, Milan; Mondadori, Milan.Fêtes et traditions au pays du Soleil Levant, collection Connaissance de l'Asie, Editions Société continentale d'éditions modernes illustrées, Paris, 1970, 364 p.réédition Chiron, 1975.Tôkyô, Éditions Tallandier, Paris, 1969.Japon, art et civilisation, Editions Arts et Métiers Graphiques, Paris, 1969 (traduction Thames and Hudson, Londres; Abrams, New York).Le Shintô, esprit et religion du Japon, Éditions Bordas, Paris, 1972, 159 p.L'Inde, phénomène spirituel, Edition Bordas, Paris, 1972.Le Japon en collaboration avec J.Pezeu-Masabuau, Encyclopoche, Larousse, Paris, 1977.In Quest of the Bible ( Archeology and the Scriptures), Ferni, Genève, 1978; Montréal, Canada, 1978.Encyclopædia of Asian Civilizations (10 vol.), J.-M. Place, Paris 1977–1987.Le Tir à l'Arc, technique et matériel, Edition Robert Laffont,Paris, 1979,réédition 1985.La Peinture indienne, Edition Famot, Genève, 1980.La Vie quotidienne dans la péninsule indochinoise à l'époque d'Angkor (800-1300), Edition Hachette, Paris, 1981.Dictionnaire de l'archéologie en collaboration avec Guy Rachet, Edition Robert Laffont, 1983.La Vie quotidienne au Japon au début de l'ère moderne (1868-1912), Éditions Hachette, 1984, 404 p. traduction Panstwovy Varsovie; Hollandia, Amsterdam.Le Tigre et la Rose (vie de Nûr Jahân), Edition Robert Laffont, Paris, 1984.traduction Nea Synora, Athènes.La Route de la Soie, en collaboration avec des auteurs chinois, Edition Arthaud, Paris, 1985.Kangxi, grand Khân de Chine, Edition Arthaud, Paris, 1985.Japon, l'empire éternel, Éditions du Félin, collection « Les Racines de la connaissance », Paris, 1985.Akbar, le Grand Moghol, Edition Denoël, Paris, 1986.Japon intime, Éditions du Félin, coll. « Les Racines de la connaissance », 1985, 396 p.Le Japon, hier et aujourd'hui, Belford, Paris, 1986; traduction Scala, Milan.Dictionnaire de la civilisation indienne, édition Robert Laffont, collection Bouquins, 1987, 1276 p.Le Lotus, Edition le Félin,Paris, 1988.Dictionnaire des Arts martiaux, Edition Le Félin, Paris, 1988; réédition 1993 (traduction Athlon Pres, Londres; Sperling & Kupfer, Milan).Dictionnaire de la Corée, Préface de Christine Shimizu, Edition Le Félin, Paris, 1988.L'Inde de l'Islâm, Edition Arthaud, Paris, 1989,304 p.Les Miniatures indiennes, Edition Crémille,Genève, 1989.Les Estampes japonaises, en collaboration avec Christine Shimizu, Edition Crémille, Genève, 1990.Les Noces indiennes de Râma et Sîtâ ( Le Râmâyana),Edition le Rocher, Paris, 1990.A Dictionary of the Martial Art, Éditions Charles E. Tuttle Company Inc., 1991, 288 p.Khajurâho, Edition Bordas, Paris, 1991; traduction Dumont, Cologne.Les Dieux du bouddhisme, Éditions Flammarion, Paris, 1992, collection « Tout l'Art » réédition 2006, 360 p. , traduction New York, 1995).L'Art de l'Inde et de l'Asie du Sud-Est, édition Flammarion, Paris,|collection Tout l'art, Paris, 1994, 479 p.L'Inde mystique et légendaire, Edition Le Rocher, Paris, 1994.Borobudur, photos de Jean Louis Nou, Imprimerie nationale, Paris, 1994; traduction Jaca Books, Milan; Hirmer, Münich, 1995; Abrams, New York, 1996.Majestueuse Indonésie, photos De Wilde, Edition Atlas, Paris, 1994.L'Arc et la Flèche, Edition le Félin, Paris, 1995.Bouddha en son temps, Le Félin, Paris, 1995.Inde , vision de lumière, photos de Suzanne Held,Edition Hermé, Paris, 1995.Birmanie, vision du Myanmar, photos de Suzanne Held, Edition Hermé, Paris, 1996.Histoire de l'Inde et des Indiens, Critérion, coll. « Histoire et histoires », 1996, 816 p.Japon. Dictionnaire et civilisation'', Éditions Robert Laffont, coll. « Bouquins », Paris, 1996, 1419 p.

References

External links 

  Library of Congress Authority File
 Deutsche Nationalbibliothek Authority File

1923 births
Writers from Paris
1996 deaths
French Indologists
French Japanologists
20th-century pseudonymous writers
École pratique des hautes études alumni
University of Paris alumni
French art historians